Marth (pronunciation: MAHRT) is a Thuringian municipality in the district of Eichsfeld in Germany, in the Verwaltungsgemeinschaft Haustein-Rusteberg.

References

External links
Marth fire brigade
Verwaltungsgemeinschaft Hanstein-Rusteberg

Eichsfeld (district)